The Basketball Bundesliga 2012–13 was the 47th season of this championship. The regular season started on 3 October 2012 and ended on 27 April 2013, after 34 rounds. Brose Baskets from Bamberg won its 6th German championship and its 4th straight title. Runner-up was EWE Baskets Oldenburg.

Team information

Standings

|}

The league deducted a total of six points from Gießen over the course of the season as a result of the team's insolvency.

Playoffs

Bracket

Quarterfinals

Brose Baskets vs. Phoenix Hagen

EWE Baskets Oldenburg vs. Telekom Baskets Bonn

ratiopharm Ulm vs. Artland Dragons

Bayern Munich vs. Alba Berlin

Semifinals

Brose Baskets vs. Bayern Munich

EWE Baskets Oldenburg vs. ratiopharm Ulm

Final

Brose Baskets vs. EWE Baskets Oldenburg

Statistical leaders

Points

Rebounds

Assists

Awards
Most Valuable Player:  John Bryant (Ratiopharm Ulm)
Finals MVP:  Anton Gavel (Brose Baskets)

References

External links
German League official website  

Basketball Bundesliga seasons
German
1